Albert Ernest Pratt (16 April 1893 – 19 July 1916) was a New Zealand cricketer. He played one first-class match for Auckland in 1912/13. He was killed in action during World War I.

See also
 List of Auckland representative cricketers
 List of cricketers who were killed during military service

References

External links
 

1893 births
1916 deaths
New Zealand cricketers
Auckland cricketers
Cricketers from Auckland
Australian military personnel killed in World War I
Australian military personnel of World War I
Australian Army soldiers